Truro and St Austell was a county constituency in Cornwall represented in the House of Commons of the UK Parliament from its 1997 creation to its 2010 abolition by Matthew Taylor of the Liberal Democrats, who was appointed a life peer in the House of Lords following his service as a Member of Parliament (MP). The constituency elected one MP by the first past the post system of election.

History
The constituency has existed in a number of different forms. The Truro constituency, up until 1885 elected two MPs; this was reduced to one. In 1918 the constituency was abolished but it was recreated again in 1950.

In 1997, in spite of the fact that no boundary changes were made to Truro on that occasion, the Boundary Commission nonetheless saw fit to change its name to Truro and St Austell, reflecting the fact that St Austell has a larger population than Truro. The Truro seat became a safe Liberal seat due to the popularity of its former MP, David Penhaligon, who died in a car crash in 1986, aged 42. He was succeeded in a by-election the following year by Matthew Taylor, who held the seat comfortably until his retirement, at the constituency's abolition, in 2010.

Boundaries
The District of Carrick wards of Boscawen, Chacewater, Feock, Kea, Kenwyn, Moresk, Newlyn, Perranzabuloe, Probus, Roseland, St Agnes, St Clement, Tregolls, Trehaverne; and the Borough of Restormel wards of Crinnis, Mevagissey, Poltair, Rock, St Ewe, St Mewan, St Stephen-in-Brannel, Trevarna, Treverbyn.

The constituency was centred on the former district of Carrick (which contains the city of Truro) and the former borough of Restormel (which contains the town of St Austell).

Boundary review
Following a review of parliamentary representation in Cornwall, the Boundary Commission for England created an extra seat for the county which meant consequential changes for the existing seats. The constituency of Truro and St Austell, which was abolished, was partly succeeded by St Austell and Newquay.

The city of Truro forms part of the newly created Truro and Falmouth constituency.

Members of Parliament

Elections

Elections in the 2000s

Elections in the 1990s

For elections before 1997, see Truro

See also
List of parliamentary constituencies in Cornwall

Notes and references

Sources
Robert Beatson, A Chronological Register of Both Houses of Parliament (London: Longman, Hurst, Res & Orme, 1807) 

Constituencies of the Parliament of the United Kingdom established in 1997
Constituencies of the Parliament of the United Kingdom disestablished in 2010
Parliamentary constituencies in Cornwall (historic)
Politics of Truro
St Austell